Dieter Jung (born October 9, 1941, in Bad Wildungen, Hessia) is a German artist working in the field of holography, painting and installation art. He lives and works in Berlin.

Education 
Dieter Jung was raised in Oberdielfen / Siegen (Province of Westphalia). He studied theology at Kirchliche Hochschule Berlin from 1962 to 1963 and fine arts at the Hochschule für bildende Künste (today Berlin University of the Arts) until 1968. While he was attending the École des Beaux-Arts in Paris he also encountered Arthur Adamov and Alberto Giacometti in 1965. From 1971 to 1974 he studied experimental film at the German Film and Television Academy Berlin.

Work 
Jung's first academic post was a guest professorship in 1975 at Universidade Federal da Bahia, Salvador, Brazil. In 1977 he realized his initial holograms "Feathers" at the New York School of Holography (conducted by Sam Moree and Dan Schweitzer) and developed 1977 in collaboration with Donald White from Bell Laboratories in his garage in New Jersey the technical requirements for the first holographic poem, "Hologramm". From 1982 until 1985 he explored with Jody Burns (Holoplate, New Jersey) the efficiency of One-step Rainbow Holography and created the series "Into the Rainbow", "Present Space" and "Different Space".

Between 1985 and 1989 Jung worked as research fellow at the Center for Advanced Visual Studies/MIT in Boston (directed by Otto Piene) in connection with the Spatial Imaging Group (directed by Stephen Benton) at the Media Lab/MIT on the cycle of holographic LightMills, which was inspired by Harold Edgerton´s Multiflash photography and relating to ZERO's early work "Silberne Lichtmühle" (Silver Light-Mill). Guest lectures followed at Harvard University and at Sorbonne University, Paris.

1990/91 Jung acted as a member of the founding council at the Academy of Media Arts in Cologne where he served as a professor for creative holography and light art until 2007. From 1992 to 1996 he was a member of the board of trustees of the Center for Art and Media/ZKM in Karlsruhe. In 1996 he directed the international conference and exhibition "Holographic Network: A Visual Journey between Art, Science and Technology" at the Academy of Arts, Berlin.

In 1997–99 he served as a member of the MIT Advisory Council on Art-Science-Technology. The development of Holokinetic Mobiles, HoloMobiles XYZ and TransOptical (Transformation optics) Mobiles is since 1998 one of his fields of activities, as well as the development of Floor Holograms and the research into interactive laser installations since 2002. Oraculum; Light installations: "Strings", "Light in Flight" and "Loops", holographic "TimeCapsules". Since 2010 member of the academic board of advisors of ZERO foundation in Düsseldorf. 2011 member of the International György Kepes Society in Hungary. Since 1970 Jung participated in numerous lectures, workshops and exhibitions throughout the world.

The development of Holokinetic Sculptures "Perpetuum Mobile", HoloMobiles XYZ and TransOptical Mobiles, animated by the kinetic sculptures of Alexander Calder and George Ricky, became since 1998 extended fields of his involvement. After the elaboration of Floor Holograms and interactive Laser installations ("Oraculum – for two lasers and three canvases") he continued creating a variety of Light-works "Strings", "LightFlight", "Loops", holographic "Time Capsules" and the "Particle wave" prints, hence revealing and extending a different perception of motion in space, light and colours.

In 2010 he became a member of the academic board of advisors (now think tank) of ZERO foundation in Düsseldorf, and in 2011 he joined the International György Kepes Society in Hungary. Since 1970 Jung has participated in numerous conferences, workshops and exhibitions throughout the world.

Dieter Jung is one of the pioneers in holographic art. This art, apart from being a form of optical illusion, constitutes a specific phase in the history of Light Art. Illusionist tendencies exist in art since the earliest times and were at certain periods even considered as forming an integral part of Western art. As to the luminous phenomenon with its curious ambiguity between presence and absence it is at the heart of all holographic art and can be compared to our perception of the stars whose physical presence has been superseded by the luminous wave which reaches our eye long after having been emitted. The aesthetics of absence has been the privilege of the mystics of all times, but its metaphysical side is counterbalanced by its scientific connotation in the area of holographic art.

"One of the pioneers in holographic art" (excerpt) written by Frank Popper, Paris 2008 for the exhibition "Invisible-Visible" of Dieter Jung, Today Art Museum Beijing—full text

Grants and awards 
Awards: 1965/66 Fellowship by French Institute (Institut Français) for the École des Beaux Arts Paris. 1967 The German National Merit Foundation (Studienstiftung des Deutschen Volkes). 1968–69 USA Fellowship by German Academic Exchange Service (DAAD); 1977 Artist-in- Residence at the MacDowell Colony, Peterborough, New Hampshire, USA. 1978 Artist in Residence at Yaddo, Saratoga Springs, New York; Grant by Cabin Creek Center for Work and Environmental Studies, New York. 1983 Artist-in-Residence grant, Museum of Holography New York. 1984 Stiftung Kunstfonds, 1985–86 Rockefeller-Fellow at the Center for Advanced Visual Studies, MIT; Grant by the Council for the Arts of the MIT. 1988 and 2003 Award by the Shearwater Foundation, USA. 2003 Grant by ZEIT-Stiftung, Ebelin und Gerd Bucerius, Hamburg.

Solo exhibitions 
1968 Dieter Jung, Galerie Defet, Nuremberg, Germany
1973 Galerie Haus Seel, Siegen, Germany
1974 Museo de Arte Moderna do Rio de Janeiro, Brazil; Museu de Arte de São Paulo; Dieter Jung, Galeria San Diego, Bogotá, Colombia
1975 Bilder: Gemälde-Aquarelle-Bilder-Filme, Haus am Waldsee, Berlin, Germany
1977 Asociacion Cultural Humboldt, Caracas, Venezuela
1979 Drawings and Paintings, Pointdexter Gallery, New York, N.Y., USA
1981 Écriture Holographique, La Revue parlée de Blaise Gautier, Centre Georges Pompidou, Paris, France
1982 Goethe House, New York, United States
1983 Hara Museum of Contemporary Art, Tokyo, Japan
1984 Holography in Art, Hong Kong Arts Center, Hong Kong; Pinturas – Desenhos – Hologramas, Museu de Arte de São Paulo, Brazil.
1985 Dieter Jung – Hologrammeja/Piirroksksia/Maalauksia, Näyettey Kluuvin Galleria, Helsinki, Finland; Dieter Jung, Musée de Québec, Quebec City, Canada; Art Basel; Museum of Holography, New York; Dieter Jung-Installation, Museum of Holography, New York, N.Y., USA
1986 Center for Advanced Visual Studies (CAVS), MIT, Cambridge, Massachusetts, US
1987 Dieter Jung, Galleria Marrozini, San Juan, Puerto Rico
1988 Dieter Jung, Paris Art Center, Paris, France
1990 Dieter Jung, Hologramme/Zeichnungen, Art Center Zamalek, Cairo, Egypt
1991 Dieter Jung, Bilder/Zeichnungen/Hologramme, Kunsthalle Berlin, Berlin, Germany
1992 Dieter Jung-Bilder/Zeichnungen/Hologramme, Ulmer Museum, Ulm, Germany; Dieter Jung, Goethe-Institut Madrid, Spain; Palais de Luxembourg, Paris
1993 Dieter Jung, Escola das Belas Artes, Salvador, Brazil
1998 Dieter Jung, Galerie Schoeller, Düsseldorf, Germany
1999 Dieter Jung, Trinitatiskirche, Cologne, Germany
2002 Kibela Gallery, Maribor, Slovenia
2003 Kun Shan University, Tainan, Taiwan POC; Dieter Jung – Anders als man denkt, Museum im Kulturspeicher, Würzburg, Germany; Kunst-Museum in Ahlen, Germany;  Kunstmuseum Heidenheim, Heidenheim, Germany; Dieter Jung, Virtual Images, Kun Shan University, Tainan, Taiwan
2004 Dieter Jung, Hologram Works-The extended Space to Dénes Gábor, Ateliers Pro Arte, Budapest, Hungary
2005 Shantou University, Guangdong, China; Dieter Jung, The Garden of Light, Taipei Fine Arts Museum Taipei POC
2006 Zendai Museum of Modern Art Shanghai; Dieter Jung, The Passion of Light, Zendai /Himalaya Museum of Modern Art, Shanghai, China
2007 A-Space Beijing; Beijing; Imperial City Art Museum, Beijing; Dieter Jung- Installation, Goethe Institut Shanghai, China; Dieter Jung, Holographie und Lichtkunst, Cubus Kunsthalle, Duisburg, Germany; Dieter Jung, Looking Forward- Multimedia Holography and LightArt, A-Space Beijing, China; Beijing Imperial City Art Museum, Beijing, China
2008 Phases/Faces, Oroom Gallery, Seoul, Korea; Dieter Jung – Invisible-Visible, Today Art Museum, Beijing, China
2009 Dieter Jung, Fliegende Farben, Städt. Galerie Haus Seel, Siegen, Germany; Dieter Jung, A Visit to Berlin 2009, Today Art Museum, Beijing, China
2010 Dieter Jung, Flying Colors – Moments of Seeing OCT Art & Design Gallery, Shenzhen, China
2011 Today Art Museum, Beijing; Dieter Jung, Space-Light-Colour, LinLin Gallery, Beijing, China

Group exhibitions 

 1968: Nouvelle École de Berlin, Galerie Motte, Geneva / Milan / Paris
 1969: New York Studio School, New York
 1971: Kunsthalle, Baden-Baden, Germany
 1976: Musée National de Monaco, Monte Carlo, Monaco
 1977: Berlin Now, Contemporary Art
 1977: Denise René Gallery, New York; New York Avant Garde Festival, World Trade Center, New York
 1979: Museum of Holography, New York; Holographie, Neuer Berliner Kunstverein, Berlin, Germany
 1981: Museum of Natural History, Beijing, China
 1983: Light Dimensions, Science Museum, London, England; Ars Electronica, Linz, Austria
 1985: East-West Encounter, National Center for The Performing Arts, Bombay, India;  National Geographic Society's Explorers Hall, Washington, USA; Mehr Licht, Kunsthalle Hamburg, Hamburg, Germany; A Imagem Holografica, Calouste Gulbenkian Foundation, Lisbon, Portugal
 1986:  Museum Charlottenborg, Copenhagen, Denmark; LUMIÈRES –Perception/ Projection, Centre d´Art Contemporaine de Montréal, Quebec, Canada; Holomedia, Städt. Galerie im Prinz-Max-Palais, Karlsruhe, Germany; Lichtjahre, Künstlerhaus Wien, Vienna, Austria; Holography, Institut for Telecommunication, Beijing, China; Internationale Poesifestival, Oslo Konzerthus, Oslo, Norway
 1987: Ologrammi, Museo de  Fotographia, Florence, Italy; Light Dreams, Kalamazoo Institute of Arts, Michigan, USA; Morris Museum, Morristown, New Jersey, USA; National Museum of Science, Ottawa and Montreal, Canada
 1988: LightsOrot, Yeshiva University Museum, New York; Museum of Science, Los Angeles
 1990: Fotografie, Wissenschaft und neue Technologien, Kunstmuseum Düsseldorf, Germany
 1992: Moving Image, Museum Fundació Joan Miró, Barcelona, Spain
 1993: Virtual-Real Image, The World of Holography ´93, Daimaru Museum, Tokyo, Japan; Das Licht-Die Musik-Der Raum, with Otto Piene, Heinz Mack, Günther Uecker, Ferdinand Kriwet, music by Karlheinz Stockhausen, Landtag Nordrhein-Westfalen, Düsseldorf, Germany; MIT Museum, Cambridge, Massachusetts, US; 81996 Holographic Network, Akademie der Künste Berlin and Bauhaus Archiv Berlin, Germany
 1997: UNESCO, Paris, France
 1999: Natura della luce, Galleria d'Arte Contemporaneo, Venice, Italy; Farblicht, Städtische Galerie Würzburg and Kunstmuseum Heidenheim, Germany; Malerei, Galerie Neher, Essen, Germany; Lumia, International Lyskunst, Charlottenborg Museum, Copenhagen, Denmark; Kangastus Mirage, Rauman Taidemuseo, 9.10-5.12.1999, Finland
 2000: Manege, St. Petersburg, Russia; Kangastus Mirage, Verutitalli-Salon kaupungin taidemuseo, 14.1-12.3.2000; Kemin taidemuseo, 16.6.-20.8.2000; Kajaanin teidemuseo, 3.9-29.10.2000, Finland; Machines Times, V2, Rotterdam, Netherlands
 2001: SkyArt Conference, Delphi and Ikaria, Greece; College of Fine Arts, Paddington, Sydney, Australia
 2005: Two Asias-Two Europes, Doland Museum of Modern Art, Shanghai, China; Enseigner /Produire: Exposition Enquête, Centre Georges Pompidou, Paris, France
 2006: Museum of Contemporary Art /ZKM, Karlsruhe, Germany; Entry Gate, Museum of Contemporary Art, Shanghai, China; Motion in a Square, Museum Ritter, Waldenbuch, Germany
 2007: Remote Control, Museum of Contemporary Art Shanghai, China
 2008:  Museo de Arte Moderno, Mérida, Venezuela
 2009:  Museo Alejandro von Humboldt, Havana, Cuba; Animamix, Today Art Museum, Beijing, China
 2010: Animamix, Guangdong Art Museum, Guangzhou, China; Luminous Windows, MIT Museum, Cambridge, MA, USA; The Year We Make Contact, Media Scape, HDLU Croatian Association of Artists, Zagreb, Croatia
 2011: Future Pass, 54th Biennale di Venezia, Abbazia di San Gregorio, Venice, Italy
 2015: Interact: Deconstructing Spectatorship: East Wing Biennial, The Courtauld Institute of Art, London, England (with a. o. Liu Bolin, Sebastian Brajkovic, Matthew Buckingham, Pablo Delgado, Petra Feriancova, Felix Gonzalez-Torres, Donald Martiny, Julie Mehretu, Katie Paterson, Bridget Riley, Regina Silveira, Marc Quinn, Shezad Dawood)

Publications

By Dieter Jung
Books
Editor, 2003 Holographic Network, by Dieter Jung with essays by Elizabeth Goldring, Otto Piene, Frank Popper, Roger Malina, Paul Earls, Eberhard Roters, Christian Schneegass and Siegfried Zielinski, Verlag Rasch Bramsche 2003. 

Articles
“Transcript“ in Artists Today, Marg Publications, Bombay 1987; “Holographic Space“ in Leonardo (journal), vol. 22, no 3/4,1989; Jung / Pepper “Creative Holography: Its Development in the Academy of Media Arts Cologne“ in SPIE Proceedings, vol. 1600,1991; “Bildräume der Holographie“ in Kultur und Technik im 21. Jahrhundert, edited by G. Kaiser, Frankfurt and New York 1993; “L´Espace Holographique“ in La science et la métamorphose des arts, Nouvelle Encyclopédie Diderot, Paris 1994; “Luz na Arte / Arte da Luz“ in exhibition catalogue, Goethe-Institut Salvador, Brazil1995; “Ein Kubikmeter Licht“ in Otto Piene, Kunst die fliegt, edited by H. Stachelhaus, DuMont Schauberg Köln 1998; “Holes in Sky“ in Sky Art, edited by Kracke/Knott, Center for Advanced Visual Studies and MIT, Cambridge 2005. “As I see it - The absence of darkness”, Advances in Display Holography, edited by Hans Bjelkhagen, River Valley Press, England 2006. Otto Piene, by Ante Glibota, Delight Edition, 2011. . The Transfer of Technology, Interview in ArtToday, Vol.12, Beijing 2009. The Perceptual Holograms of Dieter Jung, by Jeno Lu in Zhai Bao Rong Contemporary Art (Vol.6), Singapore/Beijing 2010.

On Dieter Jung
Books
Experiment Design by Igildo Biesele, Zürich 1986; Holographie by Peter Zec, DuMont Köln 1987; Dieter Jung – Hologrammes, Dessins, Peintures by Ante Glibota, Paris Art Center, Paris 1989; Dieter Jung – Bilder, Zeichnungen, Hologramme, Köln 1991; Art in the electronic Age by Frank Popper, London and Paris1993; Dieter Jung-Anders als man denkt by Marianne Lauter, Würzburg 2003; Dieter Jung -The Garden of Light by Fang-Wei Chang, Taipei 2005. Dieter Jung- The Passion of Light, by Chen Qibin, Shanghai 2006. Two Asias-Two Europes, by Gu Zhenqing, Timezone 8, Shanghai; LightArt from Artificial Light by Peter Weibel/Jansen, ZKM Publications: Entry Gate. Chinese Aesthetics of Heterogeneity by Samuel Kung, MoCA Shanghai; Dieter Jung- The Passion of Light, by Chen Qibin, Zendai Museum of Modern Art Shanghai; Motion in Square, by Museum Ritter/ Gerda Ridler, Heidelberg. Remote/Control by Samuel Kung, Museum of Contemporary Art, Shanghai 2007; Dieter Jung-Looking Forward by S. Zhao, Beijing 2007. Dieter Jung – Phases/Faces by Oroom Gallery, Seoul 2008; Dieter Jung, Invisible/Visible by Dai Dongmei / Chen Aier, Beijing 2008; Dieter Jung, Flying Colors-Moments of Seeing, OCT Gallery, Shenzhen 2010. The Perceptual Holograms of Dieter Jung, by Jeno Lu in Zhai Bao Rong Contemporary Art (Vol.6), Beijing 2010.

Works in public collections 
Berlinische Galerie, Berlin
Kunsthalle Bremen
Karl-Ernst-Osthaus-Museum, Hagen
Zentrum für Kunst und Medientechnologie, Karlsruhe
Hara Museum of Contemporary Art, Tokyo
Musée national des beaux-arts du Québec, Quebec City
Brooklyn Museum of Art, New York
Metropolitan Museum of Art, New York
MIT Museum, Cambridge, Massachusetts
Yellow Stone Art Center, Montana
Museum im Kulturspeicher, Würzburg
Museu de Arte de São Paulo
Museu de Arte Moderna, Rio de Janeiro
Kunsthalle Hamburg
Museo Nacional de Bellas Artes, Havana
Taipei Fine Arts Museum
Museum of Fine Arts, Kaohsiung
Treptowers, Berlin
Museum of Contemporary Art, Shanghai
Zendai Museum of Modern Art, Shanghai
Beijing Imperial City Art Museum, Beijing
Today Art Museum, Beijing
European Patent Office, Munich and The Hague

References 

Der Spiegel
Kunstforum
MIT Museum
Taipeh Times
Today Art Museum
Deutscher Künstlerbund
Shenzhen Daily 
Museum Ritter
artron
bw188
mateus-aquino
artlinkart
China Visual
Venice Biennale
Venice Biennale

External links 
 Videos
 Holographic Network

1941 births
Living people
People from Bad Wildungen
German artists
Holography